Cakile arctica, commonly known as sea rocket and Fjörukál, is a species of flowering plant in the family Brassicaceae, native to the Faroe Islands, Iceland, Norway (where it is extinct in Svalbard), and Russia (specifically North European Russia as defined in the WGSRPD). It is an annual species, i.e. it germinates, grows, flowers, produces seeds, and dies within one year. Although it was the first vascular plant to grow on Surtsey, as of 1987 it had not established itself on the island.

References 

Brassicaceae
Flora of Northern Europe